Albery Allson Whitman (May 30, 1851June 29, 1901 was an African-American poet, minister and orator. Born into slavery, Whitman created a successful career for himself as a writer, and during his lifetime was acclaimed as the "Poet Laureate of the Negro Race". Throughout his lifetime he worked as a manual laborer, school teacher, financial agent, fundraiser and pastor. He died in Atlanta in 1901 of pneumonia.

Early life and education
Whitman was born into slavery at a farm near Munfordville, Kentucky. After years as a manual laborer, working at a plowshop, on railroad construction and as a teacher, Whitman attended Wilberforce University in 1870. There he studied with Bishop Daniel Payne. Whitman stated that he wrote his 1877 poem "Not a Man and Yet a Man" so that "he might speak more effectively for Wilberforce".

Later life and family
After six months at Wilberforce, Whitman left to become the financial agent for the university and an African Methodist Episcopal Church pastor in Springfield, Ohio. He later took other pastoral positions between 1879 and 1883, leading and establishing churches in Ohio, Georgia, Kansas, and Texas. He died in 1901 of pneumonia.

Whitman had a wife, named Caddie, and four daughters. The daughters formed the vaudeville troupe The Whitman Sisters, who performed together from 1900 to the 1940s.

Style and influence
Joan Sherman's entry in African-American Poetry of the Nineteenth Century refers to Whitman's poetry as "attempts at full-blown Romantic poetry", emulating the American and British authors from that tradition. Yet Dickson Bruce argues that "Whitman went beyond sentimental ideals in his understanding of literature, and even beyond the ideological directions outlined by Douglass and his colleagues." Albery Whitman's poems are not regularly reprinted in modern anthologies of Black poetry. Benjamin Brawley referred to Whitman as "probably the ablest of the race before Dunbar," and a recent scholar echoes this view, asserting that Whitman was "one of the most important African American poets between Phillis Wheatley and Paul Laurence Dunbar and probably the most prolific."

In 1901, shortly before his death, Whitman published "An Idyl of the South: An Epic Poem in Two Parts". The opening four lines suggest high romantic poetry through a sentimental reflection on the South: "Hail land of the palmetto and the pine,/From Blue Ridge Mountain down to Mexic's sea/Sweet with magnolia and cape jassamine,/And thrilled with song, — thou art the land for me!" Ivy Wilson notes that Whitman employed "multitudinous metrical configurations" and that "he was consumed with the aesthetics of sound. Much of his major volumes read like novels in verse."

Collections
Not a Man, and Yet A Man (1877)
The Rape of Florida (1884, later republished as Twasinta's Seminoles)
An Idyl of the South: An Epic Poem in Two Parts (1901)

Critical editions and scholarship
The following works are scholarly collections of Whitman's work: 

Significant academic works about Whitman include:

Mabry, Tyler Grant. "Seizing the laurels: nineteenth-century African American poetic performance" (2011). A new set of hermeneutics for apprehending the achievements of early black poets, urging an examination of the early black poetic tradition in terms of performativity [dissertation; unpublished].

References

External links
 
Links to the full searchable text of three of his collections at American Verse Project at the University of Michigan Digital Library

1901 deaths
1851 births
African-American poets
African Methodist Episcopal Church clergy
Wilberforce University alumni
19th-century American poets
American male poets
People from Hart County, Kentucky
19th-century American male writers
Burials at South-View Cemetery
19th-century American clergy